Somewhere in Palilula is a 2012 Romanian drama film directed by Silviu Purcărete.

Cast 
 Áron Dimény -Serafim
 George Mihăiță as Ilie Tudorin
 Răzvan Vasilescu as Predoleanu
 Constantin Chiriac as Virgil Codreanu (Trotzki)
 Sorin Leoveanu as Gogu
 Ofelia Popii as Leana Mică

Reception
The film was watched by 12,253 viewers in cinemas in Romania between the premiere and December 31, 2014, according to records kept by Romania's National Center of Cinematography.

References

External links 
 

2012 drama films
2012 films
Romanian drama films